The 1999 Croatian Cup Final was a one-legged affair played between the Slavonian rivals Cibalia and Osijek. 
The leg was played in Zagreb on 30 May 1999. 

Osijek won the trophy with a result of 2–1.

Road to the final

Final

External links 
Official website 

1999 Final
NK Osijek matches
Cup Final